Kalikananda Abadhut (1910—13 April 1978) was a Bengali saint novelist and traveler.

Biography
Abadhut born to Anathnath Mukherjee in Bhowanipore, Kolkata. His real name was Dulal Chandra Mukherjee but he took a pen name Kalikananda Abadhut. After the death of his wife he became saint in Mahakaleshwar Jyotirlinga Temple in Ujjain. He was mostly popular for his book Marutirtha Hinglaj which is based on real life experience about his pilgrimage to Hinglaj. The film Marutirtha Hinglaj on his travelogue was also released in 1959. He resided few years in Uddharanpur, Bardhaman to gather experiences before writing another novel Uddharanpurer Gat. Abadhuta also practised Tantra in his personal life. He established Rudrachandi Math in Chinsurah and live his last life there till death.

Works
 Bohubrihee
 Bashikaran
 Debarigan
 Hinglajer Pare
 Uddharanpurer Ghat
 Kalitirtha Kalighat
 Marutirtha Hinglaj
 Kaushiki Kanara
 Piyari
 Nilkantha Himalaya
 Sachcha Darbar
 Saptaswara Pinakini
 Tappa Thungri
 Subhaya Bhabatu
 Sumeru Kumeru
 Swamighatini
 Kan Pete Roi
 Mon Mane Na
 Sukh Shanti Valobasa

References

Writers from Kolkata
1910 births
1978 deaths
20th-century Bengalis
Bengali writers
Bengali novelists
Bengali-language writers
Indian male writers
20th-century Indian writers
20th-century Indian male writers
Indian novelists
Indian male novelists
20th-century Indian novelists
Novelists from West Bengal
Indian religious writers
Bengali Hindu saints
People from Purba Bardhaman district
People from Kolkata